Couthenans is a commune in the Haute-Saône department in the region of Bourgogne-Franche-Comté in eastern France.

People 
Couthenans is the birthplace of:
Pierre Jacques Dormoy (1825 - 1892) a Protestant engineer, inventor, industry captain, the creator of the Dormoy foundries as well as a political and economic personality in Bordeaux.

See also
Communes of the Haute-Saône department

References

Communes of Haute-Saône
County of Montbéliard